Un homme libre (released in English as A Free Man) is a 1973 feature film written by Roberto Muller and Pierre Uytterhoeven and directed by Roberto Muller himself and starring French singer Gilbert Bécaud and actress Olga Georges-Picot.

Synopsis
Henri Lefèvre (Gilbert Bécaud) abandoned by his wife Nicole (Olga Georges-Picot) pours all his affection for his daughter (Sophie Bunoust-Roquère). He also falls in love with an American (played by Pam Huntington) which creates tensions between father and daughter as she is jealous of his father's new love interest.

Cast
Gilbert Bécaud as Henri Lefèvre
Olga Georges-Picot as Nicole Lefèvre
Sophie Bunoust-Roquère as Henri Lefèvre's daughter
Pam Huntington as "L'Américaine"
Clotilde Joano as the antiquarian
Christiane Minazzoli as sales girl 
Charles Gérard as Félix
Michel Duplaix	as Michel Duplaix

External links

1973 films
1970s French-language films
Films scored by Francis Lai
French drama films
1970s French films